Gorenje is a village in the hills northwest of Postojna in the Inner Carniola region of Slovenia.

Name
The name Gorenje is shared by several settlements in Slovenia. It arose through ellipsis of Gorenje selo (literally, 'upper village'), denoting the elevation of the place in relation to a neighboring settlement. Gorenje stands about  higher than Bukovje, the nearest neighboring village.

Church

The local church in the settlement is dedicated to Saint Leonard and belongs to the Parish of Studeno.

References

External links

Gorenje on Geopedia

Populated places in the Municipality of Postojna